La Paz County is the 15th county in the U.S. state of Arizona, located in the western part of the state. As of the 2020 census, its population was 16,557, making it the second-least populous county in Arizona. The county seat is Parker. The name of the county is the Spanish word for "the peace", and is taken from the early settlement (now ghost town) of La Paz along the Colorado River.

History

La Paz County was established in 1983 after voters approved separating the northern portion of Yuma County, making it the only county to be established after Arizona became a state in 1912, and currently the second youngest county in the United States (behind the consolidated city-county of Broomfield, Colorado, which was established in 2001). The county did not have a large enough tax base to begin supporting a separate county government immediately and had to rely on state money at first. As a result, Arizona laws were changed to make splitting other existing counties much more difficult.

Under the revised Arizona laws, a county shall not be formed or divided by county initiative unless each proposed county would have all of the following characteristics: (1) at least three-fourths of one percent of the total state assessed valuation and at least the statewide per capita assessed valuation; (2) a population of at least three-fourths of one percent of the total state population according to the most recent United States decennial census; (3) at least one hundred square miles of privately owned land; (4) common boundaries with either (a) at least three other existing or proposed counties; or (b) at least two other existing or proposed counties and the state boundary. A county formation commission is required to be formed to evaluate the feasibility of the proposed county. A proposal to divide a county must be approved by a majority of the votes cast in each proposed new county.

The Colorado River Indian Reservation is located in the western portion of the county. Part of the reservation extends westward into San Bernardino and Riverside counties in California.

Geography
According to the United States Census Bureau, the county has a total area of 4,514 sq mi (11691 km2), of which 4500 sq mi (11655 km2) is land and 14 sq mi (36 km2) (0.3%) is water.

The area that now makes up La Paz County was formerly part of Yuma County.

Flora and fauna

La Paz County hosts a variety of flora and fauna. The endangered California Fan Palm, Washingtonia filifera grows in a few spots in the county.

Adjacent counties
 Mohave County – north
 Yavapai County – northeast
 Maricopa County – east
 Yuma County – south
 Imperial County, California – southwest
 Riverside County, California – west
 San Bernardino County, California – northwest

National protected areas
 Bill Williams River National Wildlife Refuge (part)
 Cibola National Wildlife Refuge (part)
 Imperial National Wildlife Refuge (part)
 Kofa National Wildlife Refuge (part)

Demographics

2000 census
As of the census of 2000, there were 19,715 people, 8,362 households, and 5,619 families living in the county. The population density was 4.4 people per square mile (1.7/km2). There were 15,133 housing units at an average density of 3.4/sq mi (1.3/km2). The racial makeup of the county was 74.2% white, 0.8% black or African American, 12.5% Native American, 0.4% Asian, 0.1% Pacific Islander, 9.4% from other races, and 2.7% from two or more races. 22.4% of the population were Hispanic or Latino of any race. 18.9% reported speaking Spanish at home.

There were 8,362 households, with 21.2% having children under the age of 18, 54.2% were married couples living together, 8.2% had a female householder with no husband present, and 32.8% were non-families. 26.6% of households were made up of individuals, and 12.9% had someone living alone who was 65 years of age or older. The average household size was 2.32 and the average family size was 2.79.

The county population had 21.1% under the age of 18, 6.1% from 18 to 24, 20.4% from 25 to 44, 26.6% from 45 to 64, and 25.8% who were 65 years of age or older. The median age was 47 years. For every 100 females there were 105.50 males. For every 100 females age 18 and over, there were 105.10 males.

The median income for a household in the county was $25,839, and the median income for a family was $29,141. Males had a median income of $26,642 versus $20,965 for females. The per capita income for the county was $14,916.  About 13.6% of families and 19.60% of the population were below the poverty line, including 28.5% of those under age 18 and 12.9% of those age 65 or over.

2010 census
As of the census of 2010, there were 20,489 people, 9,198 households, and 5,584 families living in the county. The population density was 4.5//sq mi (1.8/km2). There were 16,049 housing units at an average density of 3.56/sq mi (1.37/km2). The racial makeup of the county was 69.8% white, 12.8% American Indian, 0.6% black or African American, 0.5% Asian, 12.5% from other races, and 3.7% from two or more races. Those of Hispanic or Latino origin made up 23.5% of the population. In terms of ancestry, 22.4% were German, 15.9% were Irish, 15.3% were English, and 2.1% were American.

Of the 9,198 households, 19.3% had children under the age of 18 living with them, 47.2% were married couples living together, 9.4% had a female householder with no husband present, 39.3% were non-families, and 32.1% of all households were made up of individuals. The average household size was 2.19 and the average family size was 2.72. The median age was 53.9 years.

The median income for a household in the county was $32,147 and the median income for a family was $37,721. Males had a median income of $35,464 versus $27,484 for females. The per capita income for the county was $21,165. About 14.3% of families and 20.3% of the population were below the poverty line, including 36.4% of those under age 18 and 6.5% of those age 65 or over.

Law enforcement

The La Paz County Sheriff's Office provides general-service law enforcement to unincorporated areas of La Paz County, serving as the equivalent of the police for unincorporated areas of the county. It also operates the county jail system. The Sheriff's Office is headquartered in Parker.

Past sheriffs are:
 Rayburn Evans (1983–88)
 Marvin Hare (1989–2000)
 Daniel "Hal" Collett (2001–08)
 Donald Lowery (2009–12)
 John Drum (2013–16)
 William Risen (2017-2020)
 William Ponce (2021-Present)

Government
La Paz County is entirely within Arizona's 9th congressional district, currently represented by Republican Paul Gosar.

Transportation

Major highways
  Interstate 10
  U.S. Route 60
  U.S. Route 95
  State Route 72
  State Route 95

Air
Avi Suquilla Airport  is a public use airport located one nautical mile (1.9 km) east of the central business district of Parker, Arizona. It is owned by the Colorado River Indian Tribes.

Rail
The county is served by the Arizona and California Railroad for freight through Parker, Arizona.

Communities

Towns
 Parker (county seat)
 Quartzsite

Census-designated places

 Alamo Lake
 Bluewater
 Bouse
 Brenda
 Cibola
 Cienega Springs
 Ehrenberg
 La Paz Valley
 Parker Strip
 Poston
 Salome
 Sunwest
 Utting
 Vicksburg
 Wenden

Unincorporated community
 Hope
 Love

Ghost towns

 Clip
 Drift Desert
 Empire Flat
 Eureka
 La Paz
 Mineral City
 Nortons Landing
 Olive City
 Swansea
 Williamsport

Indian communities
Colorado River Indian Reservation

County population ranking
The population ranking of the following table is based on the 2010 census of La Paz County.

† county seat

See also
 National Register of Historic Places listings in La Paz County, Arizona

References

External links

 County website
 
 "Bills tackle county growth", Arizona Republic, February 10, 2005
 "Arizona County Formation", Arizona Association of Counties

 
Populated places established in 1983
1983 establishments in Arizona